Catephia oligomelas is a species of moth of the  family Erebidae. It is found in Ivory Coast.

References

Catephia
Moths described in 1890
Moths of Africa